Rubratoxin B is mycotoxin with anticancer activity made by Penicillium rubrum. It has been reported to elicit antioxidative and DNA repair responses in mouse brain.

References

Mycotoxins
Rubratoxin B
Acid anhydrides
Heterocyclic compounds with 3 rings
Oxygen heterocycles